Sullivan is an unincorporated community in central Sullivan Township, Ashland County, Ohio, United States.  It has a post office with the ZIP code 44880.  It lies at the intersection of U.S. Route 224 with State Route 58.

History
Sullivan was laid out in 1836. A post office called Sullivan has been in operation since 1828, which was closed in the summer of 2015.
"Visit your new local Post Office™ at 245 Township Road 481!

References

Unincorporated communities in Ohio
Unincorporated communities in Ashland County, Ohio
1836 establishments in Ohio
Populated places established in 1836